Dolna  is a village in the administrative district of Gmina Leśnica, within Strzelce County, Opole Voivodeship, in south-western Poland.

The oldest known mention of the village comes from 1302, when it was part of the Piast-ruled fragmented Kingdom of Poland. From 1871 to 1945 it was part of Germany. In 1936, during a massive campaign of renaming of placenames, the Nazis changed its name to Niederkirch to remove traces of Polish origin, and from 1940 to 1943 they operated a forced labour camp for Jews in the village.

There is a Gothic church of Saints Peter and Paul and a mass grave of Polish insurgents from 1921 in the village.

References

External links 
 Jewish Community in Dolna on Virtual Shtetl

Dolna